Rämen is a lake in southern Dalarna circa  southwest of Borlänge.

In the 1930s auto racing was held on and around the lake, one of the races was the Swedish Winter Grand Prix.

References 

Swedish Grand Prix
Motorsport venues in Sweden
Dalälven basin
Lakes of Dalarna County